Rottweil – Tuttlingen is an electoral constituency (German: Wahlkreis) represented in the Bundestag. It elects one member via first-past-the-post voting. Under the current constituency numbering system, it is designated as constituency 285. It is located in southwestern Baden-Württemberg, comprising the districts of Rottweil and Tuttlingen.

Rottweil – Tuttlingen was created for the inaugural 1949 federal election. Since 2021, it has been represented by Maria-Lena Weiss of the Christian Democratic Union (CDU).

Geography
Rottweil – Tuttlingen is located in southwestern Baden-Württemberg. As of the 2021 federal election, it comprises the districts of Rottweil and Tuttlingen.

History
Rottweil – Tuttlingen was created in 1949, then known as Rottweil. It acquired its current name in the 1987 election. In the 1949 election, it was Württemberg-Hohenzollern constituency 3 in the numbering system. In the 1953 through 1961 elections, it was number 192. In the 1965 through 1983 elections, it was number 196. In the 1987 through 1998 elections, it was number 189. In the 2002 and 2005 elections, it was number 286. Since the 2009 election, it has been number 285.

Originally, the constituency comprised the districts of Rottweil and Tuttlingen. In the 1965 through 1976 elections, it also contained the municipality of Wilflingen from the Hechingen district and the municipalities of Bärenthal and Beuron from the Sigmaringen district. Since the 1980 election, it has again comprised the Rottweil and Tuttlingen districts.

Members
The constituency has been held continuously by Christian Democratic Union (CDU) since its creation. It was first represented by Karl Gengler from 1949 to 1957, followed by Bruno Heck from 1957 to 1976. Franz Sauter was representative from 1976 to 1990. Volker Kauder was representative from 1990 to 2021, a total of eight consecutive terms. He was succeeded by Maria-Lena Weiss in 2021.

Election results

2021 election

2017 election

2013 election

2009 election

References

Federal electoral districts in Baden-Württemberg
1949 establishments in West Germany
Constituencies established in 1949
Rottweil (district)
Tuttlingen (district)